"All My Ex's Live In Texas" is a song written by Sanger D. Shafer and Lyndia J. Shafer, and recorded by American country music singer George Strait.  It was released in April 1987 as the second single from Strait's album Ocean Front Property. "All My Ex's Live In Texas" was nominated for Best Male Country Vocal Performance at the 1988 Grammy Awards.

A version of the song recorded by its co-author Sanger D. Shafer appeared in the film Road House, the video game Grand Theft Auto: San Andreas and TV show Ash vs Evil Dead. Rapper Drake mentions the song in his single "HYFR".

The song "Tip Your Bartender" by New York post-hardcore band Glassjaw, contains the lyric: 
"All my ex's live with hexes."

The format of the song is that of a list song.

Content
The narrator explains that he had lived most of his life in Texas along the Frio River (Brazos River in Shafer's original recording, Colorado River in his later performances), but that a string of failed relationships with women in that state that ended disastrously (such as going insane, sending the law after him and walking out before the honeymoon) prompted him to flee to Tennessee; he still relives his more pleasant times in Texas by way of Transcendental Meditation each night. The song is known for its Western Swing style rhythm.

Critical reception
"All My Ex's Live in Texas" is widely regarded as one of Strait's best songs. Billboard and American Songwriter ranked the song number two and number five, respectively, on their lists of the 10 greatest George Strait songs.

Kevin John Coyne of Country Universe gave the song a B+ grade, saying that "you can almost hear the guy smirking as he sings this swinging hit, running down a list of jilted lovers from all over the Lone Star state."

Charts

Certifications

References

External links
 

1987 singles
1986 songs
George Strait songs
Songs about Texas
Songs written by Sanger D. Shafer
Song recordings produced by Jimmy Bowen
MCA Nashville Records singles